Peeling Back The Years was a six-part radio series originally broadcast on BBC Radio 1 from 26 September to 31 October 1987 and repeated on BBC 6 Music from 25 October to 27 October 2005.  In the series Radio 1 DJ John Peel discussed his life and career at length with his long-time producer John Walters and also played some of his favourite records.

The show's theme music was "Blue Tango" by Ray Martin which, Peel revealed, was the first record he ever bought.

External links 

Listen to Peeling Back The Years online - BBC 6 Music website

BBC Radio 1 programmes
John Peel